"Angel" is a song by American singer Lionel Richie. It was written by Richie, Paul Barry, and Mark Taylor for his sixth studio album Renaissance (2000), while production was helmed by Brian Rawling and Taylor. Island Def Jam released "Angel" as the album's lead single in October 2000. Richie's highest-charting success in years, it reached the top ten in Austria, Germany, the Netherlands, and on the US Billboard Adult Contemporary chart, while peaking at number 18 on the UK Singles Chart.

Music video
An accompanying music video for "Angel" was filmed by German directors Wolf Gresenz und Bernard Wedig and took ten days to be completed. Budgeted at 650.000 D-Mark, it marked production company Blow Film's first video with international clients. Shot in Berlin, including locations such as the Babelsberg Studios in Potsdam-Babelsberg and the Berlin Alexanderplatz station, it went into post production after its third day of filming.

Credits and personnel
Credits adapted from the liner notes of Renaissance.

 Production – Brian Rawling, Mark Taylor
 Assistant engineers – Jong Uk Yoon, Chris Anderson
 Additional guitars – Paul Jackson Jr.
 Additional recording – Dirk Vanoucek

 Keyboards, programming – Mark Taylor
 Background vocals – Tracy Ackerman
 Executive producer – Skip Miller

Track listing 

CD Maxi Single
 "Angel" (Metro Mix) - 3:45 
 "Angel" (Boogieman Remix Radio Edit) - 3:59
 "Angel" (Boogieman Remix Extended) - 6:45
 "Angel" (Crash & Burn Remix Dub) - 5:47
 "Angel" (Crash & Burn Remix Vocal) - 6:02
 "Angel" (Boogieman Remix Dub) - 6:21

Australia CD Single
 "Angel" (Chuckii B Mix) - 3:56 
 "Angel" (Metro Mix) - 3:45 
 "Angel" (Crash & Burn Remix Dub) - 5:47
 "Angel" (Crash & Burn Remix Vocal) - 6:02

UK CD Single 1
 "Angel" (Metro Mix) - 3:45 
 "Angel" (Boogieman Remix Extended) - 6:45
 "Angel" (Crash & Burn Remix Vocal) - 6:02

UK CD Single 2
 "Angel" (Metro Mix) - 3:45
 "Shout It To The World" - 3:59
 "All Night Long" (Live) - 5:51

UK Cassette Single
 "Angel" (Metro Mix) - 3:45
 "All Night Long" (Live) - 5:51

Charts

Weekly charts

Year-end charts

Certifications

References

2000 singles
2000 songs
Lionel Richie songs
Songs written by Lionel Richie
Songs written by Paul Barry (songwriter)
Songs written by Mark Taylor (record producer)
American dance-pop songs
American house music songs
Island Records singles